The Royal North Carolina Regiment was a provincial corps of Loyalists from the Province of North Carolina during the American Revolution.  Provincial corps were regiments with both British and Loyalist forces.

Officers
 Colonel John Hamilton
 Colonel/Captain John Leggett: One of the most prominent Loyalists was John Leggett, a rich planter in Bladen County. He organized and led one of the few loyalist brigades in the South (the North Carolina Volunteers, later known as the Royal North Carolina Regiment). After the war, Colonel Leggett and some of his men moved to Nova Scotia; the British gave them free land grants in County Harbour as compensation for their losses in the colony. The great majority of Loyalists remained in North Carolina and became citizens of the new nation.
 Daniel McLean
 Lieutenant McCraw
 Lieutenant Campbell
 Ensign John Shaw Gent
 Adjutant Roderick McLeod
 Ensign Charles Atkins

Known engagements
June 20, 1779 – Battle of Stono Ferry, South Carolina
March 29 – May 12, 1780 – Siege of Charleston, South Carolina
August 6, 1780 – Battle of Hanging Rock, South Carolina
August 16, 1780 – Battle of Camden, South Carolina
May 7, 1781 – Halifax, North Carolina
August 2, 1781 – Rockfish, North Carolina
August 19, 1781 – New Bern, North Carolina

References

Bibliography
 
 
 , NCHR 67
  
 
 

Loyalist military units in the American Revolution